There are several differences in pronunciation between Standard Arabic and Tunisian Arabic. Nunation does not exist in Tunisian Arabic, and short vowels are frequently omitted, especially if they would occur as the final element of an open syllable, which was probably encouraged by the Berber substratum.

However, there are some more specific characteristics related to Tunisian Arabic like the phenomenon of metathesis.

Metathesis
Metathesis is the shift of the position of the first vowel of the word. It occurs when the unconjugated verb or unsuffixed noun begins with CCVC, where C is an ungeminated consonant and V is a short vowel. When a suffix is added to this kind of noun or when the verb is conjugated, the first vowel changes of position and the verb or noun begins with CVCC.

For example:
 (he) wrote in Tunisian Arabic becomes   and (she) wrote in Tunisian Arabic becomes  .
 some stuff in Tunisian Arabic becomes   and my stuff in Tunisian Arabic becomes  .

Stress

Stress is not phonologically distinctive and is determined by the word's syllable structure. Hence, 
 it falls on the ultimate syllable if it is doubly closed:   (trousers).
 Stress falls on all the word if there is only one syllable within it:   (woman).
 Affixes are treated as part of the word:   (we write to you).

For example:
   (She brought).
   (She did not bring).

Assimilation 

Assimilation is a phonological process in Tunisian Arabic. The possible assimilations are:

  Only if C is a voiced consonant.
  Only if C is a voiceless consonant.

Phonemes

Consonants

However, some words have the same form  whatever the dialect: cow is always  (the /g/ deriving from an originally Arabic [q]), and a specific species of date is always  (the /g/ deriving from an originally Semitic [q] - e.g. Aramaic: /diqla/: date tree).

Interdental fricatives are also maintained for several situations, except in the Sahil dialect.

Phonetic notes:
 /p/ and /v/ are found in borrowed words and are usually replaced by /b/, like in ḅāḅūr and ḅāla. However, they are preserved in some words, like pīsīn  and talvza.
 /t͡ʃ/ and /d͡z/ are rarely used, for example tšīša, dzīṛa and dzāyir.
 Like in Standard Arabic, shadda "gemination" is very likely to occur in Tunisian. For example, haddad هدد meaning to threaten.

Vowels

Syllables and pronunciation simplification
As well as those characteristics, Tunisian Arabic is also known for differently pronouncing words according to their orthography and position within a text. This phenomenon is known as pronunciation simplification and has four rules:
 [iː] and [ɪ], at the end of a word, are pronounced [i] and [uː]. Also, [u] is pronounced [u] and [aː]. [ɛː], [a] and [æ] are pronounced [æ]. For example, yībdā is practically pronounced as 
 If a word finishes with a vowel and the next word begins with a short vowel, the short vowel and the space between the two words are not pronounced (Elision).
 If a word begins with two successive consonants, an epenthetic [ɪ] is added at the beginning.

References

Phonology
Arabic phonology